Pakistan Public Works Department is a Federal Department under Ministry of Housing and Works of which, Tariq Bashir Cheema is serving as federal minister and Shabbir Ali Qureshi is serving as minister of state. Its headquarters are located in Islamabad, Pakistan, and sub-offices in all the major cities of the country. PWD is in operation since pre-independence day.

Functions of Pakistan PWD
 Acquisition and development of Federal Government lands
 Maintenance of all federally owned Government Building and their furnishing except those financed from Defence budget
 Construction of federally financed Government Offices and residential accommodation
 Management of Federal Lodges
 To act as technical adviser to Federal Government in Engineering matters

The Pakistan PWD operates through
 Public Sector Development Programme
 Deposit Works
 Maintenance Works
 Sustainable Development Goals Achievement Program

Planning, Administration and Architecture constitute the organizational structure.

External links
 Pak.PWD Islamabad

Pakistan federal departments and agencies
Public works ministries